Holy Trinity Church, Margate is a Church of England church in Margate, Kent, and in the Diocese of Canterbury.

Original church
The growth of Margate during the early 19th century meant that the old church of St John was no longer large enough. The Church building act 1818 provided partial funding for church building. 24 designs were considered and that of William Edmunds was chosen.

Building
The foundation stone was laid on 28 September 1825. A procession from the garden of Hawley Square to the site of the new church was held beforehand, including the Archbishop of Canterbury, Sir Edward Knatchbull, MP for Kent, the Vicar, the Rev. W. F. Baylay, William Edmunds and local dignitaries.

The church required more funds than initially thought and was finally consecrated on 11 June 1829.

Destruction
On 1 June 1943 the church was bombed - ten people were killed, four seriously injured and forty six slightly injured. The church was reduced to a shell, though the tower survived.

New church
The church was rebuilt in the 1950s as an enlarged version of the church by Northdown Park, Cliftonville joining St Mary's Chapel, by the same architect, Harold Anderson. The tower of the old church was demolished in 1958.

References

External links
Church website

Church of England church buildings in Kent
Margate
Buildings and structures completed in 1829
Buildings and structures in the United Kingdom destroyed during World War II
British churches bombed by the Luftwaffe
19th-century Church of England church buildings
20th-century Church of England church buildings
Buildings and structures demolished in 1958
Rebuilt churches in the United Kingdom
Commissioners' church buildings